John G. Mulroe (born July 21, 1959) is a judge of the Circuit Court of Cook County and lawyer from Chicago, Illinois. Between August 2010 and June 2019, he was a Democratic state senator, representing the 10th Illinois State Senate District. He was appointed to complete the term of Democrat James DeLeo in August 2010 and elected to a full term in the Illinois State Senate in November 2010. He served in the position for nearly nine years before leaving the Illinois Senate in 2019. Robert Martwick replaced Mulroe in the Illinois Senate.

2008 judicial election
John G. Mulroe was the president of the 41st Ward Democratic Organization and ran unsuccessfully in the 2008 Democratic primary for a judicial seat in Subcircuit No. 10 of the Cook County Circuit Court. In that election Mulroe finished second to Diana L. Kenworthy. Out of more than 42,000 ballots cast for the seat on the 10th Subcircuit, Mulroe received 16,513 votes (38.42%) to Kenworthy's 17,914 (41.68%). A third candidate, Rosaire Marie Hall, garnered 19.91% with 8556 votes. Kenworthy went on to win the general election.

Illinois Senate

2010 Illinois State Senate election
Mulroe was the 2010 Democratic candidate for the Illinois State Senate in the 10th State Senate District, a seat formerly held by retired Democrat James DeLeo, a 25-year veteran of the state legislature. He won the Democratic primary on February 2, 2010 against three other Democratic candidates, collecting a total of 10,036 votes. Those votes amounted to 42.5% of total votes cast. The other candidates collected 57.5% of the total; Tom Ryan had 24.5%, Mary Sendra Anselmo had 22.3% and Wanda Majcher finished with 10.7%. DeLeo chose to leave office in August 2010 and Democratic candidate John G. Mulroe was appointed to complete the remainder of his term. Mulroe ran for a full term in the November 2010 general election.

Prior to his appointment to office, Mulroe's primary victory set up a general election contest with Chicago's only Republican alderman, Brian Doherty. During the primary election Mulroe received the endorsement of the Chicago Tribune's editorial board over the three other Democratic candidates. He also received numerous other endorsements from newspapers, unions and elected officials.

Mulroe won election to a full term in the Illinois State Senate on November 2, 2010. His opponent, Doherty, conceded the election shortly after 9 p.m. on election night. As of November 5, 2010 Mulroe had collected 29,357 votes, 55.4% of the total, topping Doherty's 23,611 votes, 44.6% of the total votes cast.

Judicial career
Mulroe was recommended by Mary Jane Theis and appointed by the Illinois Supreme Court to the judicial vacancy created by the retirement of Judge Thomas R. Allen in Circuit Court of Cook County's 10th Subcircuit. The subcircuit includes all or parts of Harwood Heights, Norridge, Glenview, Park Ridge, Des Plaines, Morton Grove, Niles, and the Chicago neighborhoods of Edison Park, Norwood Park, Jefferson Park, and Forest Glen. The appointment is effective June 21, 2019 and will conclude December 7, 2020, when the position will be filled by the November 2020 General Election.

Electoral history

Personal life
Mulroe is a 1977 graduate of St. Patrick High School in Chicago. He has been married to his wife Margaret for more than two decades and they have four children together. He graduated from Loyola University with a BBA in accounting and attended Loyola University Law School where he earned his Juris Doctor. In his professional life Mulroe spent six years as an assistant state's attorney and more than a decade in private practice.

References

External links
 
 Senator John G. Mulroe legislative website
 John G. Mulroe for Senate campaign website
 Biography, bills and committees at the 98th Illinois General Assembly
 By session: 98th, 97th, 96th
 Senator John Mulroe at Illinois Senate Democrats
 

Lawyers from Chicago
Politicians from Chicago
Loyola University Chicago School of Law alumni
Living people
Democratic Party Illinois state senators
1959 births
21st-century American politicians
Judges of the Circuit Court of Cook County